Xingang Township or Singang Township is a rural township in Chiayi County, Taiwan.

Geography

Administrative divisions
The township comprises 22 villages: Anhe, Bantou, Beilun, Beizi, Caigong, Datan, Daxing, Fude, Gonghe, Gonghou, Gongqian, Gumin, Haiying, Nangang, Nanlun, Sanjian, Tanda, Xibei, Xizhuang, Yuemei, Yuetan, Zhongyang and Zhongzhuang.

Education

Senior high school 
National Singang Senior High School of Arts

Junior high school 
Hsingkang Junior High School

Primary school 
Hsingkang Primary School
Wenchang Primary School
Gumin Primary School
Yuemei Primary School
Anho Primary School
Fushing Primary School

Tourist attractions
 Xingang Mazu Temple
Originally a local temple to goddess Mazu, the Xingang Mazu Temple emerged in the 21st century as a temple of regional and even national significance. It organizes annual "inspection-tour" processions through southern Taiwan and pilgrimages to Mazu temples in Mainland China, where it has opened a branch Mazu temple in Yongchun. 
 Bengang Shuixian Temple
 Bengang Tianhou Temple
 Dasing Temple
 Dengyun College
 Fengtian Temple
 Liousing Temple
 Singang Railway Park
 Southern Altar Shueiyue Nunnery

Notable natives
 Ang Ui-jin, linguist
 Hsu Chih-chieh, member of 8th Legislative Yuan
 Lin Chin-sheng, Vice President of Examination Yuan (1984–1993)
 Lin Hwai-min, dancer, writer and choreographer
 Tsai Chen-nan, actor and singer

References

External links

 Singang Township Office

Townships in Chiayi County